Storstockholms Lokaltrafik, or more formally Aktiebolaget Storstockholms Lokaltrafik (Greater Stockholm Local Transit Company), is the organisation running all of the land based public transport systems in Stockholm County. It was previously known as Stockholms Lokaltrafik and is commonly referred to as SL.

History 
SL has its origins in AB Stockholms Spårvägar (SS), a city-owned public transit company which started in 1915, by the City of Stockholm with the aim to deprivatize the two separate private tramway networks into one more efficient company. SS would in the late 1920s also acquire private motorbus companies. The first part of the Stockholm Metro was opened in 1950. SS was renamed to SL in January 1967 when the metro, local train, and bus operations in Stockholm County were merged into a single organisation under the supervision of Stockholm County Council. The different mass transit systems within the County had until then been run by different organisations, Statens Järnvägar, private companies and companies owned by the local municipalities.

In 1993, SL began to use independent contractors for the operation and maintenance of the different transport systems. For bus traffic the operators own the buses, but for rail bound traffic SL own the trains, and the contractors operate them.

Since 2012, the county council's (now Region Stockholm) traffic board and traffic administration is the regional public transport authority responsible for public transport. SL now serves as a brand name for public transport services provided by various contractors on behalf of the traffic administration. The limited company AB Storstockholms Lokaltrafik still exists and manages (apart from the brand) certain contracts and assets.

Tickets
 by one measure—single ticket price for a  journey—Stockholm has the most expensive-to-use public transport in the world.

SL's tickets
SL has two main forms of tickets. Both are used for all SL public transport within Stockholm County.
Travel card — valid during a specified period of time, from 24 hours up to a year, depending on the card.
Single journey ticket — valid for 75 minutes from activation, within Stockholm County. Single journey tickets are mainly purchased and loaded onto an SL Green card, but can be bought also by SL app or by contactless payment card.

In either case, the ticket is loaded onto a Green SL RFID card that is scanned at the start of the first journey.

It is possible also to use a contactless payment card (Mastercard, Maestro, Visa and Visa Electron) to buy a single ticket (75 min). As you board a public transport vehicle, you will be required to validate your trip every time by swiping the payment card at the rectangular validators in the front of the vehicle. If you hear a beep and see a green light, your trip has been validated.

Regardless of the ticket used, journeys by the Stockholm Commuter Rail Pendeltåg to Arlanda Airport, or crossing the county border to Uppsala and Knivsta, incur additional costs. As mentioned above, the additional cost for using the railway station at Arlanda airport is 120 SEK (can be paid either upon arrival, or in advance - then it needs to be used within 2 hours!). Travelling to Uppsala or Knivsta with SL from Stockholm County requires a valid Uppsala County (UL) ticket in addition to the usual SL ticket.

Note: Applies to SL Stockholm Commuter Rail (Pendeltåg) train only. Other operators have their own tickets including Arlanda Express. (SL Stockholm Commuter Rail (Pendeltåg) as well as National and Regional trains stop at Arlanda Central Station (Arlanda C) while Arlanda Express stops at Arlanda South (first stop): Terminal 2, 3 and 4 and Arlanda North (second and last stop): Terminal 5.)

SL's ticket prices
The prices for the most common tickets are as follows. The discounted fare is for persons under the age of 20, or over the age of 65.

Archipelago boats
Archipelago boat traffic is administered by Waxholmsbolaget. Until 29 April 2022, SL tickets that are valid for at least 30 days (30-day, 90-day, and annual travel cards) are also acceptable. It is also possible to pay with SL card credit. The price of ticket depends on length of the journey. Discounted fare is applicable for children under 19, students, and persons 65+. It is possible to buy a return ticket, but the price is the same as for two single journey tickets. Ö-card is for residents only.

Arlanda Express tickets
The Arlanda Express train between Stockholm central station and Arlanda airport has its own relatively expensive tickets or travel cards for exact number of journeys. Tickets can be bought in vending machines near the platform, or electronic tickets on the internet. Tickets are valid for 90 days. Children under 18 years travel for free when accompanied by an adult.

Flygbussarna
Flygbussarna provides transportation to four airports in Stockholm. Below are listed prices when tickets are bought online/via app. Adult and youth tickets are up to 20 SEK more expensive when bought by other ways.

Contractors

The contractors used by SL are as of July 2019 the following:

VR Sverige
Bus traffic in Ekerö, Sollentuna, Solna, Sundbyberg and Västerort.
Rail traffic on Saltsjöbanan, Nockebybanan and Tvärbanan.
Keolis
Bus traffic in Stockholm City Centre, Botkyrka, Huddinge, Lidingö, Nacka, Salem, Söderort and Värmdö.
Transdev
Bus Traffic in Danderyd, Norrtälje, Sigtuna, Täby, Upplands Väsby and Vallentuna, Vaxholm and Österåker.
Rail traffic on Roslagsbanan. 
MTR Nordic
Stockholm metro
Stockholm commuter rail
Nobina
Bus traffic in Haninge, Järfälla, Nykvarn, Nynäshamn, Södertälje, Tyresö and Upplands-Bro.
AB Stockholms Spårvägar
Spårväg City
Lidingöbanan

References

External links

 
 Tram Travels: Storstockholms Lokaltrafik (SL)

Transport in Stockholm County
Transport in Stockholm
Companies based in Stockholm
Railway companies of Sweden
Public transport companies in Sweden
Public transport authorities of Sweden